Lioness is a South African crime drama television series created by Ilse van Hemert and developed by Ochre Moving Pictures. It premiered on 28 January 2021 on M-Net.

Lead actress Shannon Esra was nominated for Best Actress in a Television Drama at the 2022 South African Film and Television Awards. In December 2022, it was announced Lioness had been renewed for a second season, which premiered on 26 January 2023.

Cast

Main

Recurring and guest

Episodes

Series overview

Season 1 (2021)

Season 2 (2023)

Production
On 8 January 2021, M-Net revealed the cast of Lioness; Shannon Esra would lead the series alongside Jacques Bessenger, Nokuthula Mavuso, Frank Rautenbach, Gerald Steyn, Joshua Eady, Fiona Ramsay, Natasha Sutherland, and Terrence Ngwila.

Vinette Ebrahim, Carl Beukes, Theo Landey, and Ayden Croy joined the cast of Lioness for its second season. Principal photography for the second season wrapped in May 2022.

Release
Fugitive scored a deal with MultiChoice to present Lioness at the MIPCOM in Cannes. Arrested Industries secured the rights to the series.

References

External links
 
 Lioness at TVSA
 Lioness at DStv

2020s crime drama television series
2020s South African television series
2021 South African television series debuts
M-Net original programming
South African drama television series
Television shows set in Botswana